Carlos Martínez Shaw (born 1945) is a Spanish historian, professor emeritus of Early Modern History at the National University of Distance Education (UNED). He is a member of the Royal Academy of History.

Biography 
Born at calle de Cano y Cueto 14, in Seville on 28 June 1945, he obtained a licentiate degree in History from the University of Seville in 1967. He earned the PhD in 1973, reading a dissertation titled Cataluña en la carrera de Indias (1680-1756).

He has been a full professor at the University of Santander/Cantabria (1984–1986), the University of Barcelona (1986–1994) and the National University of Distance Education (1994–2015).

He assumed as numerary member of the Royal Academy of History (RAH) in November 2007, covering the chair #32 left vacant by the demise of Ángel Suquía, as he read a speech titled El sistema comercial español del Pacífico (1765–1820).

Works 

 Author
 

 Co-author
 

 Editor

References 
 Citations

 Bibliography
 
 
 
 
 
 

Historians of colonialism
University of Seville alumni
University of Barcelona alumni
Academic staff of the University of Cantabria
Academic staff of the University of Barcelona
Academic staff of the National University of Distance Education
21st-century Spanish historians
Members of the Real Academia de la Historia
1945 births
Living people
20th-century Spanish historians